BancFirst Corporation is a corporation which operates under the name BancFirst, a state chartered bank in Oklahoma, United States.  It has over 100 banking locations serving 60 communities throughout the state of Oklahoma, and is the Third largest Oklahoma based FDIC insured financial institution ranked by deposits in Oklahoma   and also largest state chartered bank in Oklahoma.

History 
The roots of BancFirst date back to 1966 when lead investor and Chairman H.E. "Gene" Rainbolt purchased Federal National Bank in Shawnee, Oklahoma. Federal National had $16 million in assets at the time of purchase. Throughout the '70's, Rainbolt acquired interests in many rural Oklahoma banks and formed Thunderbird Financial Corporation to assist each bank with management services. In 1985, Rainbolt's banks in seven communities were brought under the ownership of United Community Corporation.

On April 1, 1989, BancFirst was formed and established their corporate headquarters in downtown Oklahoma City. The law changes which allowed multiple banks to merge in such a fashion were largely due to Gene Rainbolt's efforts to modernize Oklahoma's archaic banking laws.

In 1993, through an initial public offering, BancFirst began trading on the NASDAQ under stock symbol BANF. They have continued to grow through acquisitions. On January 24, 2014, BancFirst acquired the failed Bank of Union ("BOU") in El Reno, Oklahoma after the FDIC appointed them as receiver.

Currently 
BancFirst continues to grow today through branch expansion and acquisition of community banks in select Oklahoma markets. Currently, BancFirst operates in 60 Oklahoma communities in 32 of Oklahoma's 77 counties, and with over 100 service locations. The bank's ATM network provides over 350 ATMs across the state and includes all Oklahoma Walgreens stores and EZ GO locations.

As of December 2016, BancFirst's assets totaled $7,018,952, in thousands, while deposits total $6,248,057, in thousands. After 25 years as CEO, David Rainbolt became Executive Chairman of BancFirst Corp. in May 2017,  David Harlow was promoted to CEO of BancFirst Corp., and Darryl Schmidt became CEO of the company's primary subsidiary.

References

External links
 Voices of Oklahoma interview. First person interview conducted on May 10, 2019, with Gene Rainbolt.

Banks based in Oklahoma
Companies based in Oklahoma City
Companies listed on the Nasdaq
Banks established in 1966
1966 establishments in Oklahoma